Harald Aimarsen (June 9, 1881 – January 5, 1966) was a Norwegian actor.

Aimarsen was born in Kristiania (now Oslo), Norway. Among other venues, he worked at the Oslo New Theater. He acted in many films from 1919 until his death. Aimarsen died at Aker Hospital in 1966.

Filmography

 1919: Synnöve Solbakken
 1934: Synnöve Solbakken (uncredited)
 1938: Bør Børson Jr. as a hotel operator
 1941: Den forsvundne pølsemaker as Brodersen
 1943: Den nye lægen as the watchmaker
 1946: Englandsfarere as Josef
 1947: Sankt Hans fest
 1949: Gategutter
 1951: Kranes konditori (uncredited)
 1952: Andrine og Kjell
 1952: Trine!
 1954: Kasserer Jensen as Jensen's coworker
 1955: Det brenner i natt as an editorial staff member
 1955: Trost i taklampa as Smikkstad
 1955: Barn av solen
 1956: Kvinnens plass as a newspaper employee
 1957: På slaget åtte
 1958: Bustenskjold as a customer at the bar
 1959: Herren og hans tjenere
 1960: Millionær for en aften
 1961: I faresonen
 1961: Bussen
 1961: Hans Nielsen Hauge as a farmer

References

External links
 
 Harald Aimarsen at Sceneweb
 Harald Aimarsen at the Swedish Film Database

1881 births
1966 deaths
Norwegian male stage actors
Norwegian male film actors
20th-century Norwegian male actors
Male actors from Oslo